Mågerø is a small peninsula just south of the Norwegian city of Tønsberg. It is a part of the island Tjøme, a typically Norwegian summer vacation area. Mågerø is the location of the Royal Norwegian Air Force control and alert station for the southern part of Norway. The Norwegian Royal family have their summer vacation facility situated on Mågerø, which in its entirety has restricted military area status.

References 

Peninsulas of Vestfold og Telemark